Serwekai Tehsil is a subdivision located in South Waziristan district, Khyber Pakhtunkhwa, Pakistan. The population is 54,278 according to the 2017 census.

Notable people
Manzoor Pashteen

See also 
 Serwekai
 List of tehsils of Khyber Pakhtunkhwa

References 

Tehsils of Khyber Pakhtunkhwa
Populated places in South Waziristan